The 2017 World Rugby Under 20 Championship was the tenth annual international rugby union competition for Under 20 national teams. The event was organised in Georgia by rugby's governing body, World Rugby. Twelve nations played in the tournament, which was held in Tbilisi and Kutaisi from 31 May to 18 June.

Teams 

The following teams participated in the 2017 World Rugby U20 Championship:

Match officials
The following officials will oversee the thirty matches:

Referees
  Mike Adamson (Scotland)
  Nic Berry (Australia)
  Pierre Brousset (France)
  Pablo de Luca (Argentina)
  Tom Foley (England)
  Dan Jones (Wales)
  Frank Murphy (Ireland)
  Jamie Nutbrown (New Zealand)
  Jaco van Heerden (South Africa)

Assistant Referees
  Nika Amashukeli (Georgia)
  Tasuku Kawahara (Japan)
  Andrea Piardi (Italy)
  Christopher Ridley (England)
  Shota Tevzadze (Georgia)

Television match officials
  Johan Greeff (South Africa)
  Jon Mason (Wales)
  Charles Samson (Scotland)

Pool stage 

The fixtures were released in September 2016.

All times are in Georgian Standard Time (UTC+04)

Points were awarded in the Pool Stage via the standard points system: 
 4 points for a win
 2 points for a draw
 1 bonus scoring point for scoring 4 or more tries
 1 bonus losing point for losing by 7 or less points
 0 points for a loss above 7 points

If at completion of the Pool Stage two or more teams were level on points, the following tiebreakers were applied:

 The winner of the Match in which the two tied Teams have played each other;
 The Team which has the best difference between points scored for and points scored against in all its Pool Matches;
 The Team which has the best difference between tries scored for and tries scored against in all its Pool Matches;
 The Team which has scored most points in all its Pool Matches;
 The Team which has scored most tries in all its Pool Matches; and
 If none of the above produce a result, then it will be resolved with a toss of a coin.

Pool A 
{| class="wikitable" style="text-align: center;"
|-
!width="200"|Team
!width="20"|Pld
!width="20"|W
!width="20"|D
!width="20"|L
!width="20"|PF
!width="20"|PA
!width="32"|PD
!width="20"|TF
!width="20"|TA
!width="20"|BP
!width="20"|Pts
|- style="background:#ccffcc"
|align=left| 
| 3 || 3 || 0 || 0 || 128 || 58 || +70 || 18 || 6 || 2 || 14
|- style="background:#ffe6bd"
|align=left| 
| 3 || 2 || 0 || 1 || 76 || 63 || +13 || 8 || 7 || 2 || 10
|- style="background:#ffe6bd"
|align=left| 
| 3 || 1 || 0 || 2 || 93 || 78 || +15 || 13 || 9 || 2 || 6
|- style="background:#fcc"
|align=left| 
| 3 || 0 || 0 || 3 || 63 || 161 || –98 || 7 || 24 || 1 || 1
|}

Pool B 
{| class="wikitable" style="text-align: center;"
|-
!width="200"|Team
!width="20"|Pld
!width="20"|W
!width="20"|D
!width="20"|L
!width="20"|PF
!width="20"|PA
!width="32"|PD
!width="20"|TF
!width="20"|TA
!width="20"|BP
!width="20"|Pts
|- style="background:#ccffcc"
|align=left| 
| 3 || 3 || 0 || 0 || 179 || 49 || +130 || 26 || 7 || 3 || 15
|- style="background:#ffe6bd"
|align=left| 
| 3 || 2 || 0 || 1 || 69 || 86 || –17 || 11 || 10 || 1 || 9
|- style="background:#ffe6bd"
|align=left|  
| 3 || 1 || 0 || 2 || 64 || 106 || –42 || 8 || 14 || 2 || 6
|- style="background:#fcc"
|align=left| 
| 3 || 0 || 0 || 3 || 52 || 123 || –71 || 5 || 19 || 2 || 2
|}

Pool C 
{| class="wikitable" style="text-align: center;"
|-
!width="200"|Team
!width="20"|Pld
!width="20"|W
!width="20"|D
!width="20"|L
!width="20"|PF
!width="20"|PA
!width="32"|PD
!width="20"|TF
!width="20"|TA
!width="20"|BP
!width="20"|Pts
|- style="background:#ccffcc"
|align=left| 
|| 3 || 2 || 1 || 0 || 133 || 51 || +82 || 19 || 7 || 2 || 12
|- style="background:#ccffcc"
|align=left| 
| 3 || 2 || 1 || 0 || 103 || 48 || +55 || 14 || 5 || 1 || 11
|- style="background:#fcc"
|align=left|  
| 3 || 1 || 0 || 2 || 76 || 124 || –48 || 10 || 16 || 2 || 6
|- style="background:#fcc"
|align=left| 
| 3 || 0 || 0 || 3 || 40 || 129 || –89 || 4 || 19 || 0 || 0
|}

Current combined standings

Knockout stage

9–12th place play-offs

Semi-finals

11th place game

9th place game

5–8th place play-offs

Semi-finals

7th place game

5th place game

Finals

Semi-finals

3rd place game

Final

References

External links
Official website

2017
2017 rugby union tournaments for national teams
rugby union
International rugby union competitions hosted by Georgia (country)
rugby union
2017
rugby union
rugby union
rugby union